Allen John Carr (2 September 1934 – 29 November 2006) was a British author of books about stopping smoking and other psychological dependencies including alcohol addiction.

Biography
Born in Putney, London, Carr started smoking cigarettes while doing National Service aged 18. He qualified as an accountant in 1958.
Carr finally stopped smoking on 15 July 1983, aged 48, after a visit to a hypnotherapist. However, it wasn't the hypnotherapy itself that enabled him to stop – "I succeeded in spite of and not because of that visit" and "I lit up the moment I left the clinic and made my way home...". There were two key pieces of information that enabled Carr to stop later that day. First, the hypnotherapist told him smoking was "just nicotine addiction", which Carr had never perceived before that moment, i.e. that he was an addict. Second, his son John lent him a medical handbook which explained that the physical withdrawal from nicotine is just like an "empty, insecure feeling". He claims that these two realisations crystallised in his mind just how easy it was to stop and so then enabled him to follow an overwhelming desire to explain his method to as many smokers as possible.

Philosophy

Carr teaches that smokers do not receive a boost from smoking a cigarette, and that smoking only relieves the withdrawal symptoms from the previous cigarette, which in turn creates more withdrawal symptoms once it is finished. In this way the drug addiction perpetuates itself. He asserted that the "relief" smokers feel on lighting a cigarette, the feeling of being "back to normal", is the feeling experienced by non-smokers all the time. So that smokers, when they light a cigarette are really trying to achieve a state that non-smokers enjoy their whole lives. He further asserted that withdrawal symptoms are actually created by doubt and fear in the mind of the ex-smoker, and therefore that stopping smoking is not as traumatic as is commonly assumed, if that doubt and fear can be removed.

At Allen Carr Clinics during stop-smoking sessions, smokers are allowed to continue smoking while their doubts and fears are removed, with the aim of encouraging and developing the mindset of a non-smoker before the final cigarette is extinguished. A further reason for allowing smokers to smoke while undergoing counselling is Carr's belief that it is more difficult to convince a smoker to stop until they understand the mechanism of "the nicotine trap". This is because their attention is diminished while they continue to believe it is traumatic and extremely difficult to quit and continue to maintain the belief that they are dependent on nicotine.

Another assertion unique to Carr's method is that willpower is not required to stop smoking.

His contention was that fear of "giving up" is what causes the majority of smokers to continue smoking, thereby necessitating the smoker's perpetuation of the illusion of genuine enjoyment as a moral justification of the inherent absurdity of smoking in the face of overwhelming medical and scientific evidence of its dangers.  Instead, he encourages smokers to think of the act of quitting, not as giving up, but as "escaping".

Easyway

Carr left his accountancy job in 1983 and set up his first Easyway clinic. (He actually stopped smoking and modelled his program from a program called the Living Free Program for Smokers which was given by InControl International Inc. in hospitals across the U.S.) He wrote ten books which appeared as bestsellers on selected book ranking charts including his first book  The Easy Way to Stop Smoking (1985). The success of the original London clinic, through word-of-mouth and direct recommendation, has led to a worldwide network of 100 Easyway clinics in 35 countries plus the production of audio CDs and DVDs.

Allen Carr's Easyway is clinically proven through two randomised controlled trials. In 2020 a UK randomised clinical trial found Allen Carr's Easyway as good as, if not better than, the Gold Standard NHS Programme which uses NRT & 1-1 psychological support and in 2018 an Irish trial found that Allen Carr's Easyway was almost twice as effective as other smoking cessation methods available on Health Service.
Based on their full money-back guarantee (which requires two follow-up sessions without reimbursement of travel), Carr's clinics claim 90% success rate in aiding smokers to stop for three months, and 51% success rate in helping smokers stop for 12 months based on an independent study not connected with any health organisation.  Celebrity endorsements include Richard Branson, Anthony Hopkins, Ashton Kutcher, Ellen DeGeneres, Nikki Glaser, Chrissie Hynde, Michael McIntyre, Pink, Jason Mraz, Charlotte Church and Hrithik Roshan which aids the organisation's efforts to expand commercially.

Allen Carr's Clinics are run by therapists/facilitators who were once smokers and have used Carr's method to stop smoking. All therapists/facilitators are members of an association created by Allen Carr's Easyway organisation, Members of the Association of Allen Carr Therapists International (MAACTI), and membership indicates that the therapist/facilitator has completed the rigorous recruitment, and the comprehensive training & development process required before anyone can practise as an Allen Carr's Easyway therapist/facilitator. They can only do so under license with Allen Carr's Easyway (International) Ltd or Allen Carr's Easyway (US) Ltd.

Carr also wrote a number of other how-to books on subjects such as losing weight, stopping alcohol consumption, and overcoming the fear of flying. Along with his close friends, protégés, & co-authors Robin Hayley (chairman, Allen Carr's Easyway) & John C. Dicey (Global CEO & Senior Allen Carr's Easyway Therapist), he wrote books dealing with gambling, debt/junk-spending, sugar addiction, emotional eating, mindfulness, tech/smartphone addiction, caffeine addiction, vaping/JUUL with Online Video Programmes handling smoking, vaping/JUUL, alcohol, cocaine, cannabis, sugar & carb addiction, emotional eating, gambling, caffeine addiction, fear of flying, and mindfulness. In 2020, it was estimated that Allen Carr's Easyway method had helped more than 50 million people worldwide. 
In 2021, Allen Carr's Easyway assisted the World Health Organisation's year-long global campaign for World No Tobacco Day 2021.

Personal life

In late July 2006, it was revealed that he had been diagnosed with lung cancer at the age of 71. The following month he revealed that it was terminal and his life expectancy was about nine months. Carr said: "Since I smoked my final cigarette, 23 years ago, I have been the happiest man in the world. I still feel the same way today.” Carr wrote to Tony Blair, urging the UK Government and NHS to accept his method, saying that the "powerful influence" of lobbyists working for nicotine replacement firms had turned them against him.
Carr died on 29 November 2006 at the age of 72, as a result of his lung cancer. He died at his home in Benalmádena, west of Málaga, Spain.

Carr worked closely with and passed responsibility for continuing his work, developing the method to cover as many addictions and issues as possible, to his close friends and long-time collaborators Robin Hayley & John C. Dicey (Chairman & Global CEO of Allen Carr's Easyway respectively). On the insistence of international publishers John C. Dicey reluctantly allows himself to be described as co-author of Allen Carr books but makes it very clear, "I take great pleasure in deflecting any praise for the books (quite rightly so) to Allen Carr. I was extremely lucky to have worked so closely with him since 1998 and was honoured that he asked me to carry on his work".

Selected publications
(Translated into more than 45 languages)

Nicotine
 The Easy Way to Stop Smoking (1985)
 The Only Way to Stop Smoking Permanently
 Allen Carr's Easy Way for Women to Stop Smoking
 The Little Book of Quitting
 The Illustrated Easy Way to Stop Smoking
 Allen Carr's How to be a Happy Non-smoker
 Allen Carr Easyway Express
 Allen Carr's Quit Smoking Boot Camp
 Allen Carr's Easyway to Quit Vaping
 My Stop Smoking Coach with Allen Carr (Nintendo DS, 2008)
 Allen Carr's Easyway to Quit Smoking (the most up to date version of the method)

Alcohol
 The Easy Way to Stop Drinking
 Allen Carr's Easy Way to Control Alcohol

Overeating / unhealthy eating 
 Allen Carr's Easyweigh to Lose Weight
 Allen Carr's Lose Weight Now
 Allen Carr's Good Sugar, Bad Sugar
 Allen Carr's Easyway to Quit Emotional Eating

Fear of flying 
 The Easy Way to Enjoy Flying

Worry / anxiety 
 The Easy Way to Stop Worrying

Miscellaneous
	Burning Ambition: The Inspiring Story of One Man's Quest to Cure the World of Smoking
	Allen Carr's Easyway to Stop Gambling
	Allen Carr's Get Out of Debt Now
	Allen Carr's Smart Phone Dumb Phone: Free Yourself from Digital Addiction
	Allen Carr's Easyway to Mindfulness
	Allen Carr’s Easyway to Better Sleep
	Allen Carr’s Easyway to Quit Cocaine
	Allen Carr’s Easyway to Quit Cannabis

See also
 Tobacco smoking
 Smoking cessation

References

External links

Allen Carr's Easyway to stop smoking
Allen Carr's Easyway to stop drinking
Allen Carr's Easyway to lose weight
Allen Carr's Easyway to quit drugs
Allen Carr's Easyway to quit vaping
Allen Carr's Easyway top tips to stop smoking

1934 births
2006 deaths
Writers from London
English activists
English accountants
English self-help writers
Deaths from lung cancer in Spain
20th-century English businesspeople